The Green Tomb is a mausoleum of the fifth Ottoman Sultan, Mehmed I, in Bursa, Turkey. It was built by Mehmed's son and successor Murad II following the death of the sovereign in 1421. The architect Hacı Ivaz Pasha designed the tomb and the Yeşil Mosque opposite to it.

Architecture

Set amid cypresses on top of the hill in the Yeşil neighborhood in Bursa, the mausoleum stands higher than the rest of the complex. It is built on a hexagonal plan and crowned with a hemi-spherical dome. The exterior of the mausoleum is clad with the green-blue tiles that give it its name. A majority of the tiles were replaced by contemporary Kütahya tiles following damage in the 1855 Bursa earthquake. The entry portal is crowned with a semi-umbrella vault and has muqarnas niches above marble seats on both side of the entrance. İznik tiles with flower patterns in blue, white and yellow adorn the portal. 

Inside, past the carved wooden doors, the royal catafalque stands on a platform at the center surrounded by seven other tombs. It is richly decorated with scriptures and flower designs painted in yellow, white and blue glazed tiles. The lower section of walls is lined with blue-green tiles, also used in tympana of windows on the interior. The muqarnas niche of mihrab on the qibla wall is also set in a large frame of ornamental tilework: the mosaic of tiles inside the niche depicts a garden of roses, carnations and hyacinths. The chandelier and the colored glass windows are later additions.

See also
 Ali Tabrizi

Notes

References
 
 Baykal, Kazim. Bursa ve Anitlari. Türkiye Anit Çevre Turizm Degerlerini Koruma Vakfi: 1982, Istanbul. (Edited reprint of original from 1950) .
 Goodwin, Godfrey. A History of Ottoman Architecture. Thames and Hudson: London, 1997 (reprint of 1971).
 Gabriel, Albert. Une Capitale Turque, Brousse, Bursa. Paris, E. de Boccard, 1958.

External links

 Green Tomb
 ArchNet.org - Photos of the Green Tomb
 70 pictures of the tomb

Buildings and structures completed in 1421
Buildings and structures in Bursa
Ottoman architecture in Bursa
Mausoleums in Turkey
Ottoman mausoleums
Yıldırım, Bursa
Culture in Bursa